The 404th Air Expeditionary Group (404 AEG) is a provisional United States Air Force unit assigned to the United States Air Forces in Europe. It is attached to Seventeenth Air Force [Air Forces Africa], stationed at Ramstein Air Base, Germany.

The 404 AEG may be activated or inactivated at any time. Last activated on 1 October 2008, it currently provides intertheater airlift in support of US Africa Command (USAFRICOM) taskings since 1 October 2008. The 404 AEG added, in provisional status, the 459th Expeditionary Air Medical Squadron.

During contingency operations, the group forward-deploys to facilitate air and support operations for varied missions, ranging from humanitarian airlift to presidential support. The 404th AEG deployed to Rwanda in January 2009 to provide airlift for peacekeeping equipment in support of the United Nations African Union Mission in Darfur. In July 2009, the 404th AEG deployed to Ghana to provide aerial port and aircraft maintenance teams, along with forward communications, early warning, and air domain safety and security elements for U.S. President Barack Obama's visit.

History

World War II
Established as the 100th Fighter Wing and organized in England in late 1943.  Assigned to the European Theater of Operations (ETO), IX Fighter Command, Ninth Air Force.  Began operational missions in April 1944, mission of the Wing was to receive operational orders from Headquarters, IX Fighter Command and direct subordinate groups in attacking enemy targets in Occupied France and the Low Countries in preparation for the Normandy Invasion in June 1944.    Targets included bridges, roads, railroads and enemy interceptor aircraft both on the ground as well as in air-to-air combat.

After the D-Day invasion, was reassigned to IX Tactical Air Command (IX TAC) and directed to provide ground support for advancing United States First Army forces in France, attacking enemy targets initially in the Cotentin Peninsula, then supported Operation Cobra, the breakout of Normandy and attacked enemy forces in the Falaise-Argentan Gap. Wing headquarters and subordinate units operated primarily from liberated airfields and newly built temporary Advanced Landing Grounds in France, moved into north-central France, its groups attacking enemy targets near Paris then north-west into Belgium and the southern Netherlands.   In December 1944/January 1945, engaged enemy targets on the north side of the Battle of the Bulge, then moved eastward into the Northern Rhineland as part of the Western Allied invasion of Germany.

Supported First Army as it crossed the Rhine River at Remagen then moved north to attack ground targets in the Ruhr, providing air support as Allied ground forces encircled enemy forces in the Ruhr Pocket, essentially ending organized enemy resistance in Western Germany.   First Army halted its advance at the Elbe River in late April 1945, the wing engaging targets of opportunity in enemy-controlled areas until combat was ended on 5 May 1945.

It remained in Europe for four months after VE Day, as part of United States Air Forces in Europe. It performed occupation duty and the destruction or shipment to the United States of captured enemy combat equipment - Operation Lusty. It was inactivated in Germany in August 1945.

From 1957

The 704th Strategic Missile Wing activated on 1 July 1957 at Vandenberg AFB, California, but was not operational until mid-November 1957. While it had two operational squadrons, its task was training on the SM-65 Atlas, PGM-19 Jupiter, and the PGM-17 Thor from November 1957 – April 1959. Not operational 6 April – 1 July 1959. The wing then was redesignated as the 404th Tactical Missile Wing on 31 July 1985. This was a "paper" administrative redesignation, and it was never activated while under this name.

As an Air Expeditionary unit, it has been activated and inactivated on several occasions by USAFE from 2003–2008. In June–July 2003 it was activated at RAF Mildenhall, UK. It was part of the 323rd AEW from 14 March – 30 April 2008 at Balotesti, Romania, when the 323 AEW served briefly as the USAF headquarters for a NATO Summit.

Operations and decorations
 Combat Operations: Combat in European Theater of Operations (ETO), 15 April 1944-May 1945.
 Campaigns: Air Offensive, Europe; Normandy; Northern France; Rhineland; Ardennes-Alsace; Central Europe

Lineage
 Established as 100th Fighter Wing on 8 November 1943
 Activated on 24 November 1943
 Inactivated on 7 November 1945
 Disestablished on 15 June 1983
 Reestablished, and consolidated (31 July 1985) with the 704th Strategic Missile Wing
 Established on 20 May 1957
 Activated on 1 July 1957
 Redesignated 704th Strategic Missile Wing (ICBM) on 1 April 1958
 Inactivated on 1 July 1959
 Redesignated: 404th Tactical Missile Wing on 31 July 1985 (Remained inactive)
 Redesignated: 404th Air Expeditionary Group and converted to provisional status on 24 March 2003
 Activated on 16 June 2003; Inactivated on 8 July 2003
 Activated on 27 August 2003; Inactivated on 19 September 2003
 Activated on 27 May 2005; Inactivated on 22 June 2005
 Activated on 28 June 2007; Inactivated on 30 July 2007
 Activated on 14 March 2008; Inactivated on 30 April 2008
 Activated on 21 August 2008; Inactivated on 15 September 2008
 Activated on 1 October 2008.

Assignments

 Ninth Air Force, 24 November 1943
 IX Fighter Command, 27 November 1943
 IX Air Support Command, 12 December 1943
 IX Fighter Command, 4 January 1944
 IX Air Support Command, 1 February 1944
 IX Fighter Command, 1 March 1944
 XIX Air Support (later, XIX Tactical Air) Command, 15 April 1944 – 28 June 1945
 Under operational control of IX Fighter Command, 15 April – 31 July 1944
 First Air Force, 6 September – 7 November 1945
 Air Research and Development Command, 1 July 1957
 Attached to Air Force Ballistic Missile Division, 1–31 July 1957
 1st Missile Division, 1 August 1957 – 1 July 1959

 United States Air Forces in Europe, for activation or inactivation any time after 24 March 2003
 Attached to Third Air Force, 16 June – 8 July 2003
 Attached to Sixteenth Air Force, 27 August – 19 September 2003
 Attached to Sixteenth Air Force, 27 May – 22 June 2005
 Attached to Third Air Force [Air Forces Europe], 28 June – 30 July 2007
 323d Air Expeditionary Wing
 Attached to Third Air Force [Air Forces Europe], 14 March – 30 April 2008
 United States Air Forces in Europe
 Attached to 48th Fighter Wing, 21 August – 15 September 2008
 Attached to Seventeenth Air Force [Air Forces Africa], 1 October 2008–present

Units

World War II Groups

 354th Fighter Group: (P-51 Mustang), 27 November – 2 December 1943; 15 April 1944 – 4 July 1945
 Under operational control of 70th Fighter Wing, 22 June – 19 August 1944
 362d Fighter Group: (P-47 Thunderbolt), 1 August 1944 – August 1945
 Attached to XIX Tactical Air Command entire period
 363d Fighter Group: (P-38/F-5 Lightning), August–October 1944
 Re-designated as 363d Tactical Reconnaissance Group 4 September 1944

 371st Fighter Group: (P-47 Thunderbolt), 1 August – 29 September 1944
 Attached to XIX Tactical Air Command entire period
 405th Fighter Group: (P-47 Thunderbolt), 1 October 1944 – 8 February 1945
 Attached to XIX Tactical Air Command entire period
 406th Fighter Group: (P-47 Thunderbolt), 1 October 1944 – 8 February 1945
 Attached to XIX Tactical Air Command entire period

Squadrons

 576th Strategic Missile Squadron: 1 April 1958 – 1 July 1959 (detached 6 April – 1 July 1959)
 644th Strategic Missile Squadron: 15 January – 1 July 1959 (detached 6 April – 1 July 1959)
 672d Strategic Missile (later, 672d Technical Training) Squadron: 1 January – 20 May 1958
 864th Strategic Missile (later, 864th Technical Training) Squadron: 23 February 1958 – 1 July 1959 (detached 1 November 1958 – 1 July 1959)
 865th Strategic Missile (later, 865th Technical Training) Squadron: 1 July 1958 – 1 July 1959 (detached 1 November 1958 – 1 July 1959)
 866th Strategic Missile Squadron: 1 September 1958 – 1 July 1959 (detached 1 November 1958 – 1 July 1959)

 37th Expeditionary Airlift Squadron: 28 June – 30 July 2007
 42d Expeditionary Airlift Squadron: 1 October 2008–present
 336th Expeditionary Air Refueling Squadron: 21 August – 15 September 2008
 351st Expeditionary Air Refueling Squadron: 21 August – 15 September 2008
 492d Expeditionary Fighter Squadron: 14 March – 7 April 2008
 493d Expeditionary Fighter Squadron: 14 March – 7 April 2008

Stations

 RAF Boxted (AAF-150), England, 24 November 1943
 RAF Greenham Common (AAF-486), England, 6 December 1943
 RAF Ibsley (AAF-347), England, 13 January 1944
 RAF Lashenden (AAF-410), England, c. 15 April – June 1944
 Cricqueville Airfield (A-2), France, 1 July 1944
 Saint-Pierre-Église, France, 10 July 1944
 Rennes Airfield (A-27), France, 8 August 1944
 Le Mans Airfield (A-35), France, 30 August 1944
 St-Dizier Airfield (A-64), France, 19 September 1944
 Metz Airdrome (Y-34), France, 29 December 1944

 Königstein, Germany, 14 April–August 1945
 Seymour Johnson AAF, North Carolina, 6 September – 7 November 1945
 Cooke (later, Vandenberg) AFB, California, 1 July 1957 – 1 July 1959
 RAF Mildenhall, England, 16 June – 8 July 2003
 Graf Ignatievo Air Base, Bulgaria, 27 August – 19 September 2003
 31st Tactical Air Base, Krzesiny, Poland, 27 May – 22 June 2005
 Ramstein AB, Germany, 28 June – 30 July 2007
 Câmpia Turzii, Romania, 14 March – 30 April 2008
 Keflavik AS, Iceland, 21 August – 15 September 2008
 Ramstein AB, Germany, 1 October 2008–present

Known aircraft and missiles

 P-38 Lightning, 1944–1945
 P-47 Thunderbolt, 1944–1945
 P-51 Mustang, 1944–1945
 SM-65 Atlas, 1958–1959

 PGM-19 Jupiter, 1958
 PGM-17 Thor, 1958–1959
 HGM-25A Titan I, 1959
 C-130 Hercules, 2008–present

References

 
 
 
 404th Air Expeditionary Group Factsheet
 404th AEG gets new commander

External links
 United States Air Forces in Europe
 United States African Command

404